Ronalds may refer to the following:

People with last name Ronalds
Albert Francis Ronalds, an Australian civil engineer
Alfred Ronalds, a fly fishing author, artist and Australian pioneer
Edmund Ronalds (1819–1889), an English chemist
Fanny Ronalds, Mary Frances "Fanny" Ronalds (1839–1916), an American socialite and amateur singer 
Sir Francis Ronalds (1788–1873), an English scientist and inventor who built the first working electric telegraph
Hugh Ronalds (1760–1833), a British nurseryman, horticulturalist and author

People with first name Ronalds
This name is actually the Latvian equivalent of Ronald. See Latvian name for explanation.

Ronalds Arājs (born 29 November 1987), a Latvian athlete
Ronalds Cinks (born 11 March 1990), a Latvian professional ice-hockey player
Ronalds Ķēniņš (born February 28, 1991), a Latvian professional ice hockey forward
Ronalds Žagars (born 1950), a former Latvian football goalkeeper